North Ormesby is an area in the town of Middlesbrough, in the Borough of Middlesbrough, North Yorkshire, England. The area has gained the common nickname of Doggy, it is of unknown origin. Population of the North Ormesby and Brambles Farm ward, as taken at the 2011 census, was 6,268. The area became its own ward in 2015.

It is situated to the south of the River Tees, the A66 and adjacent to the Cargo Fleet and South Bank areas of Middlesbrough. The Teesdale Way long-distance trail passes just to the north of the area. North Ormesby is located next to Middlesbrough F.C.'s Riverside Stadium and is a popular route for match-goers.

History

Its name, as well as those of various streets in the locality, alludes to the support given to the initial construction of North Ormesby, a new town, in the later 19th century by members of the nearby Ormesby-based Pennyman family. The name therefore comes from being in the northern part of the former Ormesby parish.

The neighbourhood has in recent years seen somewhat of a decline, with much of its original housing having long been demolished, partially as allowance for new developments, including, more recently, the erection of numerous new buildings and the restructuring of the A66 Redcar to Penrith trunk road which passes through the north of the area.

In October 2017, it was revealed to have the cheapest average house price in England and Wales, at £36,000, down 60% since 2007 (after inflation adjustment).

Notable people
 Harry Allport, footballer
 Stanley Hollis, the only person to be awarded a VC for his actions on D-day.
 James Smurthwaite (1916–1989), cricketer for Yorkshire County Cricket Club

References

External links
 North Ormesby Market

Areas within Middlesbrough
Places in the Tees Valley